Mount Ellen may refer to:

Mount Ellen (Utah)
Mount Ellen (Vermont)
Mount Ellen, village located between Muirhead and Gartcosh in North Lanarkshire, Scotland